Petrophile phylicoides is a species of flowering plant in the family Proteaceae and is endemic to southwestern Western Australia. It is a shrub with short, needle-shaped, but not sharply-pointed leaves, and more or less spherical heads of glabrous yellow flowers.

Description

Taxonomy
Petrophile phylicoides was first formally described in 1830 by Robert Brown in the Supplementum to his Prodromus Florae Novae Hollandiae et Insulae Van Diemen from material collected by William Baxter near Lucky Bay in 1823. The specific epithet (phylicoides) means "like a plant in the genus Phylica".

Distribution and habitat
Petrophile phylicoides grows in shrubland and heath with in sandy-gravelly soils on sand plains and lateritic ridges in a wide area between the Stirling Range, Israelite Bay, Tarin Rock and Newdegate in the Avon Wheatbelt, Esperance Plains, Jarrah Forest and Mallee biogeographic regions.

Conservation status
This petrophile is classified as "not threatened" by the Western Australian Government Department of Parks and Wildlife.

References

Eudicots of Western Australia
phylicoides
Endemic flora of Western Australia
Plants described in 1830
Taxa named by Robert Brown (botanist, born 1773)